Krzysztof Mikołajczak (born 5 October 1984) is a Polish épée fencer, team bronze medallist at the 2009 World Fencing Championships in Antalya and individual bronze medallist at the 2013 European Fencing Championships in Zagreb.

Mikołajczak studied pharmacy at the Medical University of Warsaw. He holds the grade of lance-corporal in the Polish Armed Forces.

References

External links

 Profile at the European Fencing Confederation

Polish male épée fencers
Living people
1984 births
Fencers from Warsaw
20th-century Polish people
21st-century Polish people